Guessens is a Grade II* listed timber-framed house at 6 Codicote Road, Welwyn, in Hertfordshire, England. It was built in the early 17th century and has later additions. From 1730 to 1765 it was the residence of the poet and dramatist Edward Young, who was also rector of Welwyn.

References 

Grade II* listed buildings in Hertfordshire
Houses in Hertfordshire
Timber framed buildings in Hertfordshire
Welwyn